The 1998 Abierto Mexicano Telcel was a men's tennis tournament played on outdoor clay courts in Mexico City, Mexico that was part of the International Series category of the 1998 ATP Tour. It was the sixth edition of the tournament and was held from 26 October through 1 November. Unseeded Jiří Novák won the singles title.

Finals

Singles

 Jiří Novák defeated  Xavier Malisse, 6–3, 6–3
 It was Novák 1st singles title of the year and the 2nd of his career.

Doubles

 Jiří Novák /  David Rikl defeated  Daniel Orsanic /  David Roditi, 6–4, 6–2

References

External links
 ITF tournament edition details

Abierto Mexicano Telcel
Mexican Open (tennis)
1998 in Mexican tennis